Mohammed El Filali (born 9 July 1945) is a Moroccan football forward who played for the Morocco in the 1970 FIFA World Cup. He also played for MC Oujda. Also, El Filali was a firefighter.

Born in El Malah (near the border of Morocco), Filali began playing senior football with MC Oujda in 1962. He became a regular starter for MC Oujda during the 1963–64 season, eventually playing all positions including goalkeeper for the club. Filali won the 1974–75 Botola with MC Oujda which led to his participation in the 1975 Mohammed V Cup.

His younger brother, Mbarek was also a Morocco international.

References

1945 births
Living people
Moroccan footballers
Morocco international footballers
Association football forwards
1970 FIFA World Cup players
1972 African Cup of Nations players
Footballers at the 1972 Summer Olympics
MC Oujda players
CR Témouchent players
Olympic footballers of Morocco
People from Oujda
Botola players
Moroccan expatriate footballers
Moroccan expatriate sportspeople in Algeria
Expatriate footballers in Algeria